Manchester Exchange may refer to:

 Manchester Exchange railway station
 Manchester Exchange (UK Parliament constituency)
 Royal Exchange, Manchester